"Mayor of Simpleton" is a song written by Andy Partridge of the English band XTC, released as the first single from their 1989 album Oranges & Lemons. The single reached No. 72 on the Billboard Hot 100 singles chart, No. 1 on its Alternative Songs chart, and No. 15 on its Mainstream Rock chart, becoming the band's best-performing single in the United States.

Background
The song began as a reggae tune and went through numerous iterations. Partridge settled on its final arrangement after discovering a C major to D major picking pattern that he thought resembled Blue Öyster Cult's "(Don't Fear) The Reaper" (1976). Unlike many other XTC songs, he instructed a specific bass part to Colin Moulding: "Colin had to work very hard to get that bass line. It's very precise. It took me a long time to work it out, because I wanted to get into the J.S. Bach mode of each note being the perfect counterpoint to where the chords are and where the melody is. The bass is the third part in the puzzle." Its lyrics are sometimes criticised for its similarity to Sam Cooke's "Wonderful World" (1960), but Partridge denied copying the song intentionally.

Lyrically, the song describes a man who is looked down upon by his girlfriend's peers for being reportedly uneducated and non-intellectual, stating that despite this, he is devoted to her; one lyric from the chorus is "I may be the mayor of Simpleton, but I know one thing and that's I love you."

Charts

See also
List of Billboard number-one alternative singles of the 1980s

References

External links
"Mayor of Simpleton" on Chalkhills
What makes this song great? - Rick Beato

1989 songs
1989 singles
XTC songs
Songs written by Andy Partridge
Virgin Records singles
Jangle pop songs